Josefin Kipper (1928–1981) was an Austrian actress. She starred in Conchita and the Engineer (1954).

Selected filmography
 The Lady in Black (1951)
 The White Adventure (1952)
 Homesick for You (1952)
 The Mine Foreman (1952)
 Such a Charade (1953)
 The Silent Angel (1954)
 Rose-Girl Resli (1954)
 Conchita and the Engineer (1954)
 Son Without a Home (1955)
 Where the Ancient Forests Rustle (1956)

References

Bibliography
 Goble, Alan. The Complete Index to Literary Sources in Film. Walter de Gruyter, 1999.

External links

1928 births
1981 deaths
Austrian film actresses
Actresses from Vienna
20th-century Austrian actresses